Saint Louis University College for Public Health and Social Justice was founded in 2013 by the combining of the School of Social Work, founded in 1930, the School of Public Health, established 1991, and the program in Criminology and Criminal Justice. The College has as its purpose to improve the health and wellbeing of the most vulnerable.

Programs
St. Louis University's College for Public Health and Social Justice offers 6 undergraduate degrees, 3 accelerated degrees, 7 masters, 13 dual-degree masters, 1 executive master's, 2 PhDs, and 3 certificates.

The College is one of 39 schools of public health accredited by the Council on Education for Public Health (CEPH) – the field’s highest accreditation. It is the only accredited school of public health in Missouri and the only school of public health at a Jesuit/Catholic university in the United States.

Public health students can also complete first-year and sophomore level coursework at SLU’s campus in Madrid, Spain.

U.S. News & World Report ranked SLU’s Master of Health Administration among the top graduate programs in the country.

Departments

There are four departments and one school of social work:
Behavioral Science and Health Education
Biostatistics
Epidemiology
Health Management and Policy
Social Work

Deans of the School
Since the school's founding:

James Kimmey (1991-1993)
Richard Kurz (1993-2001)
William True, interim (2001-2002)
Andrew Balas (2001-2004)
Homer Schmitz, interim (2004-2006)
 
Connie Evashwick (2006-2007)
Homer Schmitz, interim (2007-2010)
Edwin Trevathan (2010-2015)
Collins O. Airhihenbuwa (2016-2017)
Thomas Burroughs (July 1, 2017 – present)

Location
The College for Public Health and Social Justice is located at the SLU medical school, across from the university hospital on South Grand, about a mile south of the main campus. It is connected to the university by a shuttle bus. The School of Social Work remains on the university's main campus, on Lindell east of Grand.

References 

Saint Louis University
2013 establishments in Missouri
Schools of public health in the United States
University subdivisions in Missouri
Medical and health organizations based in Missouri